Erick Russell is an American politician from Connecticut. A member of the Democratic Party, he is the Connecticut State Treasurer. He is the first openly gay African American elected to a statewide office in the United States.

Early life and career
Russell grew up in New Haven, Connecticut, where his parents owned a convenience store and deli. He graduated from the University of New Haven in 2009 with a bachelor's degree in criminal justice, becoming the first member of his family to graduate from college. Russell earned his Juris Doctor from the University of Connecticut School of Law in 2012. During law school, he interned for the general counsel to Governor Dannel Malloy.

After graduating from law school, Russell joined law firm Pullman & Comley, based in Bridgeport, Connecticut, in their department on public and private financing, and became a partner in the firm. He also chairs the LGBT section of the Connecticut Bar Association. In 2009, Russell was elected as a vice chair of the Connecticut Democratic Party.

Connecticut State Treasurer
After Connecticut State Treasurer Shawn Wooden announced that he would not run for reelection in the 2022 Connecticut State Treasurer election, Russell announced his candidacy to succeed him. He defeated Dita Bhargava and Karen DuBois-Walton in the Democratic Party primary election in August, receiving 58 percent of the vote. In the November general election, Russell faced state representative Harry Arora, the Republican Party nominee. Russell won the election with 52 percent of the vote. Russell became the first openly gay African American elected to a statewide office in the United States. He was sworn into office on January 4, 2023.

Personal life
Russell's husband, Christopher Lyddy, is a former member of the Connecticut House of Representatives.

References

External links
 Government website
 Campaign website 

21st-century American lawyers
21st-century American politicians
Connecticut Democrats
Connecticut lawyers
Gay politicians
LGBT African Americans
LGBT people from Connecticut
American LGBT politicians
Living people
Politicians from New Haven, Connecticut
State treasurers of Connecticut
University of Connecticut School of Law alumni
University of New Haven alumni
Year of birth missing (living people)